The 18th National Congress of the People's Party was held in Madrid from 10 to 12 February 2017, to renovate the governing bodies of the People's Party (PP) and establish the party's main lines of action and strategy for the next leadership term. The congress was initially due for 2015, but the various elections held in Spain that year (local, regional and general) and the deadlock in the government formation negotiations leading up to the 2016 general election, as well as a major crisis over the issue within the opposition Spanish Socialist Workers' Party (PSOE), saw the event being delayed until early 2017.

The congress slogan was "Spain, forward". It was dubbed as a "quiet" congress for incumbent party president Mariano Rajoy, who was re-elected for a fourth consecutive term in office with 95.7% of the delegate vote in the congress (2,530 votes) and 4.3% of blank ballots (115). It also saw the sidelining from party leadership positions of former supporters of José María Aznar, who had grown a vocal critic of Rajoy within the party in the previous years, as well as the introduction of a primary system to elect the party president in future congresses; such system would see its first application in 2018. Other novelties included a reform of the party statutes that automatically granted to the party president the status of prime ministerial candidate in any Spanish general election held from that point onwards.

The two-year delay in the congress's calling was brought to the courts by a party member, with the Supreme Court of Spain ruling it as unlawful in December 2020, as it "violated the plaintiff's right of association, in its aspect of the right of democratic participation in the party".

Overview
The congress of the PP was the party's supreme body, and could be of either ordinary or extraordinary nature, depending on whether it was held following the natural end of its term or due to any other exceptional circumstances not linked to this event. Ordinary congresses were to be held every three years and called at least two months in advance of their celebration. Extraordinary congresses had to be called by a two-thirds majority of the Board of Directors at least one-and-a-half month in advance of their celebration, though in cases of "exceptional urgency" this deadline could be reduced to thirty days.

The president of the PP was the party's head and the person holding the party's political and legal representation, and presided over its board of directors and executive committee, which were the party's maximum directive, governing and administration bodies between congresses. The election of the PP president was based on an indirect system, with party members voting for delegates who would, in turn, elect the president. Any party member was eligible for the post of party president, on the condition that they were up to date with the payment of party fees and that they were able to secure the signed endorsements of at least 100 party members and of 20% of congress delegates.

Timetable
The key dates are listed below (all times are CET. Note that the Canary Islands use WET (UTC+0) instead):

14 November: Official announcement of the congress. Start of candidate submission period.
24 November: End of candidate submission period at 2 pm.
25 November: Proclamation of candidates to the party presidency.
26 November: Official start of internal electoral campaigning.
13 December: Last day of internal electoral campaigning.
16–19 December: Election of congress delegates.
10–12 February: Party congress.

Candidates

Declined
The individuals in this section were the subject of speculation about their possible candidacy, but publicly denied or recanted interest in running:

Esperanza Aguirre (age ) — Spokesperson of the PP Group in the City Council of Madrid (1995–1996 and since 2015); City Councillor of Madrid (1983–1996 and since 2015); President of the PP of the Community of Madrid (2004–2016); President of the Community of Madrid (2003–2012); Deputy in the Assembly of Madrid (2003–2012); Spokesperson of the PP Group in the Assembly of Madrid (2003); Senator in the Cortes Generales for Madrid (1996–2003); President of the Senate of Spain (1999–2002); Minister of Education and Culture of Spain (1996–1999); First Deputy Mayor of Madrid (1995–1996).
Alfonso Alonso (age ) — Deputy in the Basque Parliament for Álava (since 2016); President of the PP of the Basque Country (since 2015); Minister of Health, Social Services and Equality (2014–2016); Deputy in the Cortes Generales for Álava (2000–2002 and 2008–2016); Spokesperson of the PP Group in the Congress of Deputies (2011–2014); City Councillor of Vitoria (1996–2008); Mayor of Vitoria (1999–2007).
José María Aznar (age ) — Prime Minister of Spain (1996–2004); President of the PP (1990–2004); Deputy in the Cortes Generales for Ávila and Madrid (1982–1987 and 1989–2004); President pro tempore of the Council of the European Union (2002); President of AP/PP of Castile and León (1985–1991); President of the Junta of Castile and León (1987–1989); Procurator in the Cortes of Castile and León for Ávila (1987–1989); Secretary-General of AP in La Rioja (1979–1980).
Pablo Casado (age ) — Vice Secretary-General of Communication of the PP (since 2015); Deputy in the Cortes Generales for Ávila (since 2011); President of NNGG in the Community of Madrid (2005–2013); Deputy in the Assembly of Madrid (2007–2009).
Cristina Cifuentes (age ) — President of the Community of Madrid (since 2015); Deputy in the Assembly of Madrid (1991–2012 and since 2015); President of the PP Group in the Assembly of Madrid (2015); Government's Delegate in Madrid (2012–2015); First Vice President of the Assembly of Madrid (2005–2012); First Secretary of the Assembly of Madrid (1999–2003).
María Dolores de Cospedal (age ) — Secretary-General of the PP (since 2008); President of the PP of Castilla–La Mancha (since 2006); Deputy in the Cortes Generales for Toledo (since 2015); Minister of Defence of Spain (2016–2018); President of the Junta of Communities of Castilla–La Mancha (2011–2015); Deputy in the Cortes of Castilla–La Mancha for Toledo (2007–2015); Senator in the Cortes Generales appointed by the Cortes of Castilla–La Mancha (2006–2011); Minister of Transport and Infrastructures of the Community of Madrid (2004–2006); Secretary of State of Security of Spain (2002–2004); Undersecretary of Public Administrations of Spain (2000–2002).
Alberto Núñez Feijóo (age ) — President of the Xunta de Galicia (since 2009); President of the PP of Galicia (since 2006); Deputy in the Parliament of Galicia for Pontevedra (since 2005); First Vice President of the Xunta de Galicia (2004–2005); Minister of Territorial Policy, Public Works and Housing of Galicia (2003–2005); President of the State Society of Mail and Telegraphs (2000–2003); Secretary-General for Healthcare (1996–2000).
Alberto Ruiz-Gallardón (age ) — Minister of Justice (2011–2014); Deputy in the Cortes Generales for Madrid (2011–2014); Mayor of Madrid (2003–2011); City Councillor of Madrid (1983–1987 and 2003–2011); President of the Community of Madrid (1995–2003); Deputy in the Assembly of Madrid (1987–2003); Spokesperson of the PP Group in the Senate of Spain (1993–1995); Senator in the Cortes Generales appointed by the Assembly of Madrid (1987–1995); Spokesperson of the AP/PP Group in the Assembly of Madrid (1987–1993); Vice President of AP (1987–1989); Secretary-General of AP (1986–1987).
José Manuel García-Margallo (age ) — Deputy in the Cortes Generales for Melilla, Valencia and Alicante (1977–1982, 1986–1994 and since 2016); Minister of Foreign Affairs and Cooperation of Spain (2011–2016); Member of the European Parliament for Spain (1994–2011).
Soraya Sáenz de Santamaría (age ) — Deputy Prime Minister of Spain (since 2011); Minister of the Presidency and for Territorial Administrations of Spain (since 2016); Deputy in the Cortes Generales for Madrid (since 2004); Minister of the Presidency of Spain (2011–2016); Spokesperson of the Government of Spain (2011–2016); Spokesperson of the PP Group in the Congress of Deputies (2008–2011).
José Manuel Soria (age ) — Minister of Industry, Energy and Tourism (2011–2016); Deputy in the Cortes Generales for Las Palmas (2011–2016); President of the PP of the Canary Islands (1999–2016); Deputy in the Parliament of the Canary Islands for Gran Canaria (2003–2011); Vice President of the Government of the Canary Islands (2007–2010); Minister of Economy, Employment and Finance of the Canary Islands (2007–2010); President of the Island Cabildo of Gran Canaria (2003–2007); Councillor in the Island Cabildo of Gran Canaria (2003–2007); Mayor of Las Palmas de Gran Canaria (1995 2003); City Councillor of Las Palmas de Gran Canaria (1995 2003).

Opinion polls
Poll results are listed in the tables below in reverse chronological order, showing the most recent first, and using the date the survey's fieldwork was done, as opposed to the date of publication. If such date is unknown, the date of publication is given instead. The highest percentage figure in each polling survey is displayed in bold, and the background shaded in the candidate's colour. In the instance of a tie, the figures with the highest percentages are shaded.

PP voters

Spanish voters

Results

References
Opinion poll sources

Other

Political party assemblies in Spain
People's Party (Spain)
Political party leadership elections in Spain
2017 conferences
2016 conferences